Amorphophallus titanum, the titan arum, is a flowering plant in  the family Araceae. It has the largest unbranched inflorescence in the world. The inflorescence of the talipot palm, Corypha umbraculifera, is larger, but it is branched rather than unbranched. A. titanum is endemic to rainforests on the Indonesian island of Sumatra.

Due to its odor, like that of a rotting corpse, the titan arum is characterized as a carrion flower, and is also known as the corpse flower or corpse plant (—bunga means flower, while bangkai can be translated as corpse, cadaver, or carrion).

The titan arum's berries arrange in a regular cylindrical form that resembles the packing of spheres inside a cylindrical confinement. Those structures are also called columnar structures or crystals.

Etymology
A. titanum derives its name from Ancient Greek ("without form, misshapen" +  , "phallus", and  Titan, "titan, giant").

Description 

Like the related cuckoo pint and calla lily, it consists of a fragrant spadix of flowers wrapped by a spathe, which looks like a large petal. In the case of the titan arum, the spathe is a deep green on the outside and dark burgundy red on the inside, with a deeply furrowed texture. The spadix is almost hollow and resembles a large baguette. Near the bottom of the spadix, hidden from view inside the sheath of the spathe, the spadix bears two rings of small flowers. The upper ring bears the male flowers, the lower ring is spangled with bright red-orange carpels. The odor ("fragrance") of the titan arum resembles rotting meat, attracting carrion-eating beetles and flesh flies (family Sarcophagidae) that pollinate it. The inflorescence's deep red color and texture contribute to the illusion that the spathe is a piece of meat. During bloom, the tip of the spadix is roughly human body temperature, which helps the perfume volatilize; this heat is also believed to assist in the illusion that attracts carcass-eating insects.

Both male and female flowers grow in the same inflorescence. The female flowers open first, then a day or two following, the male flowers open. This usually prevents the flower from self-pollinating.

After the flower dies back, a single leaf, which reaches the size of a small tree, grows from the underground corm. The leaf grows on a somewhat green stalk that branches into three sections at the top, each containing many leaflets. Each year, the old leaf dies and a new one grows in its place. When the corm has stored enough energy, it becomes dormant for about four months. Then the process repeats.

However, the current record is held by a corm grown at the Royal Botanic Garden Edinburgh, weighing  after 7 years' growth from an initial corm the size of an orange. The tallest documented inflorescence was recorded at the Botanical Gardens Bonn (Germany) in May 2013 and reached 3.20 m.

Distribution
A. titanum is native solely to western Sumatra, where it grows in openings in rainforests on limestone hills. However, the plant is cultivated by botanical gardens and a few private collectors around the world.

Cultivation
The titan arum grows in the wild only in the equatorial rainforests of Sumatra, Indonesia. It was first scientifically described in 1878 by Italian botanist Odoardo Beccari. The plant flowers only infrequently in the wild. It first flowered in cultivation at the Royal Botanic Gardens, Kew, London, UK, in 1889, with over 100 cultivated blossoms since then. The first documented flowerings in the United States were at the New York Botanical Garden in 1937 and 1939. This flowering also inspired the designation of the titan arum as the official flower of the Bronx in 1939, only to be replaced in 2000 by the day lily. In the Botanical Gardens of Bonn, the titan arum was cultivated since 1932 and the largest collection was built up by Wilhelm Barthlott after 1988, about 30 flowers were recorded and researched since. The number of cultivated plants has increased in recent years, and  not uncommonly five or more flowering events occur in gardens around the world in a single year, since today the cultivation requirements for gardens are known in detail. Advanced pollination techniques mean that this plant is rarely cultivated by amateur gardeners. However, in 2011, Roseville High School (Roseville, California) became the first high school in the world to bring a titan arum to bloom.

In May 2003, the tallest inflorescence in cultivation, some 3.20 m (10 ft 5 in) high (measured from its corm, 3.07 m from the soil surface), was grown at the Botanical Garden Bonn in Germany; this record was analyzed, photographed, and documented in detail. The event was acknowledged by Guinness World Records. This event, too, was acknowledged by Guinness World Records.

Blooming

 
In cultivation, the titan arum generally requires 5 through 10 years of vegetative growth before blooming for the first time. After a plant's initial blooming, there can be considerable variation in its blooming frequency. The cultivation conditions are known in detail. Some plants may not bloom again for another 7 through 10 years while others may bloom every two or three years. At the botanical gardens Bonn, it was observed under optimal cultivation conditions that the plants flowered alternatively every second year. A plant has also been flowering every second year (2012 to 2022) in the Copenhagen Botanical Garden. Back-to-back blooms occurring within a year have been documented and corms simultaneously sending up both a leaf (or two) and an inflorescence. There has also been an occasion when a 117 kg corm produced three simultaneous blooms in Bonn, Germany.
 There was also a triplet bloom at the Chicago Botanic Gardens in May 2020 named "The Velvet Queen," but viewing was closed to the public due to COVID-19.

The spathe generally begins to open between midafternoon and late evening and remains open all night. At this time, the female flowers are receptive to pollination. Although most spathes begin to wilt within 12 hours, some have been known to remain open for 24 to 48 hours. As the spathe wilts, the female flowers lose receptivity to pollination.

Self-pollination was once considered impossible, but in 1992, botanists in Bonn hand-pollinated their plant with its own pollen from ground-up male flowers. The procedure was successful, resulting in fruit and hundreds of seeds from which numerous seedlings were eventually produced and distributed. Additionally, a titan arum at Gustavus Adolphus College, in Minnesota, unexpectedly produced viable seed through self-pollination in 2011.

Odour
The potency of the odour gradually increases from late evening until the middle of the night, when carrion beetles and flesh flies are active as pollinators, then tapers off towards morning. Analyses of chemicals released by the spadix show the stench includes dimethyl trisulfide (like limburger cheese), dimethyl disulfide (garlic), trimethylamine (rotting fish), isovaleric acid (sweaty socks), benzyl alcohol (sweet floral scent), phenol (like Chloraseptic), and indole (like feces).

Gallery

References

Bibliography
Barthlott, W. & W. Lobin (Eds.) (1998): Amorphophallus titanum – A Monograph. 226 pp, F. Steiner Verlag, Stuttgart (= Trop. subtrop. Pflanzenwelt 99, Akad. Science. Mainz). Download: http://www.lotus-salvinia.de/pdf/180.%20BARTHLOTT,%20W.%20und%20LOBIN,%20W.%20(1998),%20Amorphophallus%20titanum.pdf (19,2 MB)
Barthlott, W., Szarzynski, J., Vlek, P., Lobin, W., & N. Korotkova (2009): A torch in the rainforest: thermogenesis of the Titan arum (Amorphophallus titanum). Plant Biol. 11 (4): 499–505 
Bown, Deni (2000). Aroids: Plants of the Arum Family. Timber Press.  
Korotkova, N. & W. Barthlott (2009): On the thermogenesis of the Titan arum (Amorphophallus titanum). Plant Signaling & Behavior 4 (11): 1096–1098 
Lobin, W., Neumann, M., Radscheit, M. & W. Barthlott (2007): The cultivation of Titan Arum (Amorphophallus titanum) – A flagship species for Botanic Gardens, Sibbaldia 5: 69–86
Association of Education and Research Greenhouse Newsletter, volume 15 number 1.

External links

Three Webcams of Titan plus time-lapse videos at Gustavus Adolphus College in Saint Peter, Minnesota
3D Photo of 2004 bloom at Walt Disney World (Requires red/cyan 3D Glasses)
List of bloomings in the US since 1937
How to grow a Titan Arum
Titan Arum at the Flower Park Kagoshima of Kagoshima Prefecture, Japan 
Amorphophallus titanum YouTube video

Videos

Live-feed video
Rosie, began blooming Monday, April 23, 2018, at the Tucson Botanical Gardens in Tucson, AZ
Octavia, the eighth corpse flower to bloom in five years at the Missouri Botanical Garden, began blooming on July 9, 2017.
Kansas State University Gardens began blooming Tuesday June 27, 2017 in Manhattan, KS
Little Dougie, bloom started Wednesday May 28, 2017 at Orange Coast College in Costa Mesa, CA
Audrey, began blooming Monday June 26, 2017 at California Carnivores in Sebastopol, CA
Terra, began blooming Thursday, June 15, 2017 at the Conservatory of Flowers in San Francisco.
Java and Sumatra, began blooming Wednesday, May 31, 2017 at Chicago Botanic Garden in Glencoe, IL.
 Wee Stinky, titan arum bloom, began blooming Friday, October 14, 2016 at Cornell University in Ithaca, New York.
 Lupin, titan arum bloom, began blooming Thursday, September 22, 2016 at North Carolina State University in Raleigh, North Carolina.
 Pepe le Pew, blooming June 13, 2018 at Mitchell Park Domes, Milwaukee, WI
Putricia, blooming July 12, 2018 at Frederik Meijer Gardens & Sculpture Park, Grand Rapids, MI
Morticia – blooming Oct 19, 2018 at Amazon Spheres Seattle, WA https://www.twitch.tv/AmazonHorticulture
Bellatrix – blooming June 3, 2019 at Amazon Spheres Seattle, WA https://www.amazon.com/b/?node=16517931011&channel=fdb908f9-30a0-4654-8c7d-47bc3e32d051
Octavia – July 2019, Missouri Botanical Garden, St. Louis, Missouri, US. https://livestream.com/accounts/20357806/events/8730969
Titan VanCoug – July 2019, WSU Vancouver, Vancouver, Washington, US. Blooming July 15. https://www.youtube.com/watch?v=wNtuYsQx7BY
Cleveland Metroparks Zoo – August 2019 https://www.youtube.com/watch?v=KHr2q7vdg8k
Cal Poly – July 2020 https://www.youtube.com/watch?v=rlY8_TQrX7Y
Sprout – Longwood Gardens, Kennett Square, Pennsylvania – July 2020 https://www.youtube.com/watch?v=bECLKQLuyGI
Terra the Titan, Conservatory of Flowers in San Francisco – August 2020 https://www.youtube.com/playlist?list=PLMDbtEcOh2UTyniPiijiJBLEz9A84cWBt
Planty McPlantface, Department of Biology, Swarthmore College – May 2021 https://www.swarthmore.edu/biology/swarthmores-amorphophallus-titanum
Rotty Top, Department of Ecology & Evolutionary Biology, University of Tennessee, Knoxville – July 2021 https://www.youtube.com/watch?v=eR3lNY-jXx4
Athena, E.W. Heier Teaching Greenhouse, SUNY Binghamton University, Vestal – August 2021 https://www.youtube.com/watch?v=YbC-F-1BFj4
Uncle Fester, Bloedel Conservatory, Vancouver – August 2021 https://www.youtube.com/watch?v=I8NruYF1jBQ
Zeus, Austin Peay State University Department of Biology, Clarksville, Tennessee – June 2022 https://www.youtube.com/watch?v=GCK9EpV78ow
Berani, Arthur Ross Greenhouse at Barnard College – July 2022, New York City, New York. Blooming July 5–6. 
Terry Titan, SJSU Greenhouse Facility at San Jose State University – July 2022, San Jose, CA. Blooming July 27–28. Live Stream

Time-lapse videos
 Titan arum bloom, July 2007 Cleveland Metroparks Zoo, name Cronus by Zoo Horticulture staff. The bloomed occurred early morning Monday, July 23, 2007, the elapsed time is about 48 hours from July 22, 2007.
Trudy, UC Berkeley Botanical Garden, bloomed in June 2009. https://www.youtube.com/watch?v=dU9b7CVEAI8
Metis, E.W. Heier Teaching Greenhouse, SUNY Binghamton University, Vestal – October 15, 2010.
 Perry T. Titan, Gustavus Adolphus College, September 24 to November 7, 2013, from the corm until the spadix collapses 45 days later.
 Ohio State University May 2012.
 First flowering of 'Aaron' on 9–10 July 2015 at the Botanical Garden of Ghent University, Ghent, Belgium.
 Royal Botanic Gardens, Kew
 Mount Lofty Botanic Garden, South Australia, bloomed December 29, 2015.
 Adelaide Botanic Gardens, South Australia, bloomed February 1, 2016 and again on 3 January 2017.
 College of Biological Sciences Conservatory, University of Minnesota, name Chauncey, bloomed in February 2016.
 Cornell University College of Agriculture and Life Sciences, Ithaca, NY, bloomed 2012, 2014, 2015, and 2016.
 Indiana University Bloomington, Wally, at the Jordan Greenhouse in Indiana University, bloomed July 2016.
 Frederik Meijer Gardens & Sculpture Park, Putricia, at Frederik Meijer Gardens & Sculpture Park in Grand Rapids, MI, bloomed July 2018.
 Northwestern State University, Louisiana, June 19 to June 28, 2020
 Longwood Gardens, Kennett Square, Pennsylvania, July 13 to July 15, 2020
 Grand Valley State University, April 18 to April 22, 2022
 Huntington Library's plant “Scentennial,” bloomed June, 2022, San Marino, California. 
 Barnard College's plant “Berani,” bloomed June, 2020, New York City, New York. 
 University of Wisconsin-Milwaukee's plant “Hoot,” bloomed April 17, 2021, Milwaukee, Wisconsin. 

titanum
Endemic flora of Sumatra
National symbols of Indonesia
Taxa named by Odoardo Beccari
Thermogenic plants
Plants described in 1879